Eric Hall Dorsey (born August 5, 1964) is a former American football defensive end for seven seasons in the National Football League (NFL).  He started in Super Bowl XXV for the New York Giants.  He played college football at the University of Notre Dame and was drafted in the first round of the 1986 NFL Draft.  He was a standout at McLean High School (McLean, Virginia), where he anchored their 10-1 1980 team, playing almost every position his senior year and becoming the most heavily recruited player in school history. In 2011 he was inducted into the McLean High School Hall of Fame but didn’t attend the induction ceremony.

See also
History of the New York Giants (1979-1993)

1964 births
Living people
American football defensive ends
Notre Dame Fighting Irish football players
New York Giants players
Players of American football from Washington, D.C.